Mohcine Jazouli (born 10 March 1967) is the Moroccan Delegate-Minister to the Head of Government of Investment, Convergence and the Evaluation of Public Policies. He was appointed as minister on 7 October 2021.

Education 
Jazouli holds a Master of Computer Science (1986) from the University of Paris-Sud and a Master in Decision Support Engineering (1991) from the Paris Dauphine University.

References 

Living people
21st-century Moroccan politicians
Moroccan politicians
Government ministers of Morocco
1967 births

Paris-Sud University alumni
Paris Dauphine University alumni